"Something's Gone" is a song by Swedish singer Pandora. It was released in May 1994 as the fourth and final single from her debut studio album One of a Kind (1993). It features an uncredited rap by K-Slim. The song peaked at number 18 on the Swedish charts.

Track listing
CD Single
 "Something's Gone" (Ragga Dance Cut) - 4:21
 "Something's Gone" (Album Version) - 4:46

CD Maxi
 "Something's Gone" (Ragga Dance Cut) - 4:21
 "Something's Gone" (Album Version) - 4:46
 "Something's Gone" (Orbital Trance Edit)	- 3:43
 "Something's Gone" (Heavenly Edit)	- 5:22

Chart performance

References

1994 singles
1993 songs
English-language Swedish songs
Virgin Records singles
Pandora (singer) songs